The Nokia Asha 305 is a "Full Touch" phone powered by Nokia's 
Series 40 operating system. It was announced at Bangkok by Nokia 
along with two other Asha Full Touch phones - the Nokia Asha 306 and 
311. Its main features are the Full Touch resistive touchscreen and 
dual SIM.

History and availability 
The Nokia Asha 305 was announced at Bangkok by Nokia, and the 
announcement offered global availability from 3Q of 2012. The phone's 
suggested price was €63 subject to taxes and subsidies.

Hardware

Screen and input 
The Nokia Asha 305 has a 3.0-inch resistive touchscreen (multi point) 
with a resolution of 240 x 400 pixels (QVGA). According to Nokia, it is 
capable of displaying up to 65 thousand colors.

The back camera has an extended depth of field feature (no mechanical 
zoom), no flash and has a 4× digital zoom for both video and camera.  
The sensor size of the back camera is 2-megapixel, has a f/2.8 aperture 
It is capable of video 
recording at up to 176 x 144 px at 10 fps with mono sound.

Buttons 
On the front of the device, there are the answer/call keys, on the right side of the device there are the volume rockers and the lock/unlock button.

Battery and SIM 
The battery life of the BP-4U (1100 mAh) as claimed by Nokia is 14 hours of talk time, from 528 hours of standby and 40 hours of music playback 
depending on actual usage.

The main SIM card is located under the battery, which can be accessed by removing the back panel of the device. No tool is necessary to remove the back panel. A second SIM card slot (hot swappable) is located in the edge of the phone.

Storage 
Located on the left side of the phone below the SIM2 socket, additional storage is available via a hot swappable microSDHC card socket, which is certified to support up to 32 GB of additional storage.

Software 
The Nokia Asha 305 is powered by Nokia Series 40 Full Touch operating system and comes with a variety of applications:

 Web: Nokia (proxy) Browser for Series 40
 Conversations: Nokia Messaging Service 3.2 (instant messaging and e-mail) and SMS,  MMS
 Social: Facebook, Twitter, Flickr, and Orkut
 Media: Camera, photos, music player, Nokia Music Store (on selected market), Flash Lite 3.0 (for YouTube videos), video player, Music Mania
 Personal Information Management: Calendar, detailed contact information
 Utilities: Notes, calculator, to-do list, alarm clock, voice recorder, stopwatch

The device comes with Nokia Maps for Series 40 and make use of cellular network for positioning as there is no GPS in the phone. The software provides step-by-step instructions, allows the user to see the route on a map and search for nearby points of interest. Depending on where the phone was purchased, regional maps (Europe, South America, etc.) are preloaded and, as such, an active internet connection to download map data is not required.

See also
 List of Nokia products
 Comparison of smartphones

References

External links
 https://web.archive.org/web/20140330060859/http://press.nokia.com/2012/06/06/nokia-accelerates-the-journey-to-mobile-internet-with-the-introduction-of-asha-touch-device-range/
 http://www.nokia.com/global/products/phone/asha305/specifications/
 https://www.webcitation.org/6HzyWPIZd?url=http://www.developer.nokia.com/Devices/Device_specifications/Asha_305/

Asha 305
Mobile phones introduced in 2012